Roman Kumlyk - (b. 4th Dec 1948 in Jasienow Gorny, desc. 22nd Jan 2014 in Verkhovyna, Ukraine) - the Ukrainian folk and filharmonic musician, a folk instruments constructor, a founder of the folk band called "Cheremosh" [ukr. Черемош, pol. Czeremosz]. He was also a founder of the Museum of Musical Instruments and Hutsuls Lifestyle in Verkhovyna (2000). The exhibits such as traditional clothes, Hutsul ceramics, households items and instruments (e.g. trembita, violins, cimbalom, hurdy-gurdy, bagpipes, accordions, different kind of pipes) have been collected for over 30 years. After his death, the museum and musical shows were continued successfully by his family.

He became a teacher for many young folk musicians and he himself played over 30 different instruments and gave a great number of concerts in his country and abroad.

References 

Ukrainian culture
Ukrainian folk musicians